The hooded mountain tanager (Buthraupis montana) is a species of bird in the tanager family Thraupidae. It is the only member of the genus Buthraupis. This yellow, blue and black tanager is found in forest, woodland and shrub in the Andean highlands of Bolivia, Colombia, Ecuador, Peru, and Venezuela.

Taxonomy
The hooded mountain tanager was formally described in 1837 by the French naturalists Alcide d'Orbigny and Frédéric de Lafresnaye from a specimen collected in the Bolivian Yungas. They coined the binomial name Aglaia montana. It is now the only species placed in the genus Buthraupis that was introduced in 1851 by the German ornithologist Jean Cabanis. The genus name combines the Ancient Greek bou- meaning "huge" and thraupis an unknown small bird but used by ornithologists to signify a tanager. The specific name is from the Latin montanus  meaning "of the mountains".

Six subspecies are recognised:
 B. m. venezuelana Aveledo & Perez, 1989 – northwest Venezuela
 B. m. gigas (Bonaparte, 1851) – north Colombia
 B. m. cucullata (Jardine & Selby, 1842) – west, central Colombia to Ecuador
 B. m. cyanonota Berlepsch & Stolzmann, 1896 – north, central Peru
 B. m. saturata Berlepsch & Stolzmann, 1906 – southeast Peru
 B. m. montana (d'Orbigny & Lafresnaye, 1837) – west Bolivia

References

Birds of the Northern Andes
hooded mountain tanager
Taxonomy articles created by Polbot